The 2014 Punta del Este ePrix, formally the 2014 FIA Formula E Julius Baer Punta del Este ePrix was a Formula E motor race held on 13 December 2014 at the Punta del Este Street Circuit in Punta del Este, Uruguay. It was the first Punta del Este ePrix and the third championship race of the single-seater, electrically powered racing car series' inaugural season, the first in the Americas.

Report

Background
Jean-Éric Vergne, Salvador Duran and Antonio Garcia were brought in to replace Franck Montagny, Katherine Legge and Ho-Pin Tung respectively. Vergne, Durán and Nick Heidfeld were voted for to receive the FanBoost.

Race
Jean-Éric Vergne started on pole position. Behind him were Nelson Piquet Jr., Nicolas Prost, and Sébastien Buemi. Piquet immediately overtook Vergne and Buemi overtook Prost, while the whole field safely squeezed through the first chicane. Nick Heidfeld used his FanBoost and went up to fifth position. On the fourth lap, Sam Bird went over a kerb in the first corner and, unable to steer, hit the wall. This brought out the safety car.

Green flags were waved on the sixth lap, but the race was soon neutralized again when Da Costa had to retire on track. After that, Vergne managed to pass Piquet for the lead. Buemi tried to pass him as well, but locked up his front wheels. Both drivers had to use the run-off area, but kept their positions.

On the sixteenth lap, Piquet had fallen back behind both e.dams drivers, and Vergne made his pit stop. Meanwhile, Stéphane Sarrazin's suspension failed when he hit a kerb and he crashed out. This brought out a third safety car. Bruno Senna had hit the wall in the same incident, but managed to switch cars at the same time as his rivals, without losing much time.

On the twentieth lap, Heidfeld was leading the race, but received a drive-through penalty for exceeding the maximum power usage. Nicolas Prost was then penalized in the same manner. This left the top three as Buemi, Vergne, Piquet. A fourth safety car was called on lap 27 when Matthew Brabham crashed exactly like Sarrazin did earlier.

With two laps left to race, Vergne used his FanBoost as soon as the safety car pulled off, but did not manage to take the lead. Buemi, however, cut the chicane and it was debated whether he should relinquish his position. Before any action was carried out, however, Vergne ran out of power and retired. He did score three points for his pole position. Buemi took the victory with Piquet second and Di Grassi third. Further back, Heidfeld used his FanBoost and managed to take tenth position, and with that a championship point, by beating Antonio Garcia to the line by just three hundreds of a second.

Results

Qualifying

Race

Notes:
 – Three points for pole position.
 – Two points for fastest lap.

Standings after the race

Drivers' Championship standings

Teams' Championship standings

 Notes: Only the top five positions are included for both sets of standings.

References

External links

 Official results

|- style="text-align:center"
|width="35%"|Previous race:2014 Putrajaya ePrix
|width="30%"|FIA Formula E Championship2014–15 season
|width="35%"|Next race:2015 Buenos Aires ePrix
|- style="text-align:center"
|width="35%"|Previous race:N/A
|width="30%"|Punta del Este ePrix
|width="35%"|Next race:2015 Punta del Este ePrix
|- style="text-align:center"

Punta del Este ePrix
Punta del Este ePrix
Punta del Este ePrix